Borang is a small village within Bhalayakharka Village Development Committee, in Lamjung District of Gandaki Province in Nepal.

Populated places in Lamjung District